The Rosstown Railway Heritage Trail is an unusual kind of rail trail, covering the former Rosstown Railway line in Melbourne, Australia. Almost the entire length of the former private railway has been replaced by roads, except for one section of off-road multi-use path, west of Grange Road. The trail is marked by signs in various places. It is approximately 7 km in total length.

External links 
 RailTrails.org.au
Glen Eira City Council Rosstown Rail Trail Map

Rail trails in Victoria (Australia)
Heritage trails in Australia